Tuy Phước is a township and capital of Tuy Phước District, Bình Định Province, Vietnam.

References

Populated places in Bình Định province
District capitals in Vietnam
Townships in Vietnam